Krzysztof Żyłka (born 10 December 1979) is a Polish para table tennis player who competes in international table tennis competitions. He is a World silver medalist and a four-time European bronze medalist, he has also competed in the 2016 and 2020 Summer Paralympics but did not medal in either Games.

References

1979 births
Living people
People from Sanok
Polish male table tennis players
Paralympic table tennis players of Poland
Table tennis players at the 2016 Summer Paralympics
Table tennis players at the 2020 Summer Paralympics